Marvell Wynne (born December 17, 1959) is an American former professional baseball player. He played eight seasons in Major League Baseball for the Pittsburgh Pirates (1983–85), San Diego Padres (1986–89), and Chicago Cubs (1989–90), primarily as a center fielder. He also played one season in Japan, in 1991. Wynne batted and threw left-handed. He is also the father of professional soccer player Marvell Wynne.

Career
In an eight-season career, Wynne, a graduate of Chicago's Hirsch High School, posted a .247 batting average with 40 home runs and 244 RBI in 940 games played. In 1984, Wynne hit .266 BA with 77 runs, 174 hits, 24 doubles, 11 triples, 24 stolen bases in 154 games – all career-highs. On April 13, 1987, Wynne, Tony Gwynn, and John Kruk became the first players in major league history to open a game with three consecutive solo home runs in a 13–6 San Diego Padres win over the San Francisco Giants. All three players were left-handed.

Wynne was a member of the 1989 Cubs team that won the National League East Division title. The team lost to the San Francisco Giants in the NLCS. Wynne played in Japan for the Hanshin Tigers of the Central League in 1991.

Personal life
Wynne's son Marvell Wynne II was a defender for the San Jose Earthquakes of Major League Soccer.

References

External links

Baseball Almanac
Marvell Wynne - Baseballbiography.com

Major League Baseball center fielders
Pittsburgh Pirates players
San Diego Padres players
Chicago Cubs players
Hanshin Tigers players
Gulf Coast Royals players
Charleston Royals players
Jackson Mets players
Tidewater Tides players
American expatriate baseball players in Japan
African-American baseball players
1959 births
Living people
Baseball players from Chicago
21st-century African-American sportspeople
20th-century African-American sportspeople
Leones de Yucatán players
American expatriate baseball players in Mexico